Masol is a paleontological and prehistoric site in the Himalayan foothills of northwestern India, in the state of Punjab, a few kilometers north of Chandigarh. It dates from the end of the Pliocene (around 2.7 million years ago up to 600 thousand years ago). It represents the oldest paleontological record of Homo located outside of Africa.

References 

Paleolithic sites
Chandigarh
 Pliocene
 Homo fossils
 Punjab, India
 Himalayas